Christian Enriquez (born October 25, 1998) is an American soccer player who currently plays for Chattanooga Red Wolves in the USL League One.

Career

Youth
Enriquez played high school soccer at Helix High School, and club soccer for USSDA side Nomads SC, who he helped to US Youth Soccer national championships in both 2013 and 2014.

College
In 2016, Enriquez attended California Polytechnic State University to play college soccer. In two seasons with the Mustangs, Enriquez made 33 appearances, scoring a single goal and tallying 2 assists. In January 2018, Enriquez announced he would leave college early to pursue a professional career.

Professional
In February 2018, Enriquez signed for USL Championship side Portland Timbers 2. He left the club after a single season without making a first team appearance.

From February to July 2019, Enriquez played semi-professionally with NPSL side ASC San Diego. He won the NPSL Golden Ball with seven goals and six assists in 19  games.

Later in the year and in early 2020, Enriquez appeared for NISA side San Diego 1904, making 8 appearances.

On June 18, 2021, Enriquez joined USL League One side Forward Madison. He made his debut the following day, starting in a 2–0 loss to New England Revolution II.

Enriquez signed with Chattanooga Red Wolves on January 19, 2023.

References

1998 births
American soccer players
Association football midfielders
Cal Poly Mustangs men's soccer players
Chattanooga Red Wolves SC players
Forward Madison FC players
Living people
National Independent Soccer Association players
National Premier Soccer League players
People from San Diego
Portland Timbers 2 players
Soccer players from San Diego
United States men's youth international soccer players
USL League One players